John Victor Woollam (14 August 1927 – 1 February 2006) was a British Conservative politician. He was elected as the Member of Parliament (MP) for Liverpool West Derby at a 1954 by-election. He served until 1964, when the seat was gained by Labour candidate Eric Ogden. Woollam was the last Conservative MP to represent Liverpool West Derby, which has become a Labour stronghold in recent years.

References 

Who's Who

External links 
 

1927 births
2006 deaths
Conservative Party (UK) MPs for English constituencies
UK MPs 1951–1955
UK MPs 1955–1959
UK MPs 1959–1964
Members of the Parliament of the United Kingdom for Liverpool constituencies